Sharp Räsänen (born 17 February 1999) is a Finnish professional footballer who plays for  KuPS, as a defender.

References

1997 births
Living people
Finnish footballers
Kuopion Palloseura players
SC Kuopio Futis-98 players
AC Oulu players
Veikkausliiga players
Ykkönen players
Kakkonen players
Association football defenders